National Highway 709B, is a National Highway in India. The highway starts from Akshardham in Delhi. It is a spur road of National Highway 9. NH-709B traverses the states of Delhi and Uttar Pradesh passing through various towns and cities in Western Uttar Pradesh like Baghpat, Shamli, Thanabhawan, Rampur Maniharan, Saharanpur, Behat, Shakumbhari. Shamli acts as a major junction as two other major highways of the area (709A) and (709AD) intersect with (709B) at Shamli.

Route 
Akshardham - Khajoori Khas - Loni, Ghaziabad - Khekra - Baghpat - Baraut - Kandhla - Shamli - Rampur Maniharan - Saharanpur -  Behat

Junctions list 

  Terminal near Akshardham 
  near Loni.
  near Khekra.
  near Baghpat.
  near Shamli.
  near Shamli.
  Terminal near Saharanpur.

See also 
 List of National Highways in India
 List of National Highways in India by state

References

External links 
 NH 709B on OpenStreetMap

National highways in India
National Highways in Uttar Pradesh